HSPS or HSPs may refer to:
 The plural form of Heat shock protein
 High School for Public Service: Heroes of Tomorrow, a public high school in Brooklyn, New York, U.S.
 The plural form of Highly sensitive person
 Highly Sensitive Person Scale, a measure of HSPs' defining trait, sensory processing sensitivity (SPS)
 Historical Studies in the Physical Sciences (later renamed Historical Studies in the Natural Sciences), a University of California Press academic journal
 Holy Spirit Preparatory School, a preparatory school in Atlanta, Georgia, U.S.
Human, Social and Political Sciences, an undergraduate course offered by the University of Cambridge

See also
 HSP (disambiguation)